Ryan Harrison was the defending champion, but did not participate.

Nick Kyrgios won the title, defeating Jack Sock 2–6, 7–6(7–4), 6–4 in the final.

Seeds

Draw

Finals

Top half

Bottom half

References
 Main Draw
 Qualifying Draw

2014 ATP Challenger Tour
2014 Singles